Adrian Britnell is an Australian set designer and artist.

His props and decorations have featured in such films as Razzle Dazzle: A Journey into Dance and Star Wars: Episode II – Attack of the Clones and his paintings are inspired by quirky pop culture, bold brush strokes, colour, texture and form.

Adrian's paintings have been displayed at such venues as Art Treasury, Bondi Beach, 2009.

He is a graduate of National Institute of Dramatic Art (NIDA)

References

External links
 Official website

Living people
Year of birth missing (living people)
National Institute of Dramatic Art